= Eugenia oil field =

Oil field located in the Black Sea

Eugenia
- Country: Romania
- Region: Black Sea
- Block: Pelican
- Offshore/onshore: offshore
- Operator: Sterling Resources

Field history
- Discovery: 2010
- Start of development: 2014
- Start of production: 2015

Production
- Current production of oil: 5,000 barrels per day (~2.5×10^{5} t/a)
- Estimated oil in place: 16.5 million tonnes (~ 19×10^{6} m^{3} or 120 million bbl)
- Estimated gas in place: 1,000×10^{6} m^{3} 36×10^{9} cu ft

The Eugenia oil field on the continental shelf of the Black Sea was discovered in 2010 and developed by Sterling Resources. It was scheduled to begin producing oil in 2015. The total proven reserves of the Eugenia oil field are around 120 million barrels (16.5 million tonnes), and production is centered on 5,000 barrels per day (790 m^{3}/d).
